Marco Zúñiga (born 4 December 1978) is a Chilean biathlete. He competed in the men's 20 km individual event at the 2006 Winter Olympics.

References

1978 births
Living people
Chilean male biathletes
Olympic biathletes of Chile
Biathletes at the 2006 Winter Olympics
Place of birth missing (living people)